Joshua Cheetham (born 26 October 1992) is a British short track speed skater. He competed in the 2018 Winter Olympics.

References

1992 births
Living people
British male short track speed skaters
Olympic short track speed skaters of Great Britain
Short track speed skaters at the 2018 Winter Olympics